Hoag is a surname. It may also refer to:

 Hoag, Nebraska, an unincorporated community in the United States
 3225 Hoag, an asteroid
 Hoag (health network), in Orange County, California